Caroline Kuhlman (born August 25, 1966) is an American retired tennis player.

Tennis career
During her tennis career she reached one WTA Tour final and won five singles and three doubles titles on the ITF Women's Circuit. Her best WTA ranking was No. 52 (August 4, 1986).

WTA Tour finals

Singles (1 runner-up)

References

External links
 
 

1966 births
Living people
American female tennis players
Goodwill Games medalists in tennis
Grand Slam (tennis) champions in girls' doubles
Wimbledon junior champions
Competitors at the 1986 Goodwill Games
21st-century American women